Phyllonorycter quercialbella is a moth of the family Gracillariidae. It is known from Québec in Canada and the eastern United States including Illinois, New York and Kentucky.

The wingspan is about 7 mm.

The larvae feed on Quercus species, including Quercus alba, Quercus macrocarpa, Quercus nigra and Quercus velutina. They mine the leaves of their host plant. The mine has the form of a tentiform mine on the underside of the leaf.

References

External links
Bug Guide

quercialbella
Moths of North America
Moths described in 1859